William Raymond Lee (August 15, 1807 – December 26, 1891) was an officer in the Union Army during the American Civil War. He was born in Salem, Massachusetts. His father was also named William Raymond Lee and his mother was Hannah Lee (née Tracy). He married Helen Maria Amory and had 3 children: Elizabeth Amory (b. 1843), Arthur Tracy (1844–1870) and Robert Ives (b. 1846). He served as colonel of the 20th Massachusetts Infantry Regiment and led it during the Battle of Antietam. After the war ended he was brevetted brigadier general.

See also
List of Massachusetts generals in the American Civil War

References
William Raymond Lee on JSTOR

1807 births
1891 deaths
Union Army colonels
People from Salem, Massachusetts
Military personnel from Massachusetts